Noel Murambi (born 29 January 1989) is a Kenyan volleyball player. She is part of the Kenya women's national volleyball team. She participated at the 2015 FIVB Volleyball Women's World Cup and at the 2016 FIVB Volleyball World Grand Prix.

In 2017 she was in the Kenya Pipeline team in Cairo as they contested the Women’s Africa Club Volleyball Championship.

She was chosen to represent Kenya at the 2020 Summer Olympics.

Clubs 
  Kenya Pipeline

References

External links 
 Getty

1987 births
Living people
Kenyan women's volleyball players
Volleyball players at the 2020 Summer Olympics
Olympic volleyball players of Kenya
People from Nyeri County